The 2018 UConn Huskies football team represented the University of Connecticut during the 2018 NCAA Division I FBS football season as a member of the East Division of the American Athletic Conference. They played their home games at Rentschler Field. They were led by head coach Randy Edsall in his second year of his second stint and 14th year overall. They finished the season 1–11, 0–8 in AAC play to finish in last in the East Division. They set the single-season FBS record for most yards and most points allowed in a single season. This included giving up 50.42 points per game (breaking Louisiana-Lafayette’s record of 50.27 in 1997) and allowed 617.4 yards per game (breaking Kansas' record of 560.83 in 2015).

Previous season
The Huskies finished the 2017 season 3–9, 2–6 in AAC play to finish in a three-way tie for fourth place in the East Division.

Preseason

Award watch lists
Listed in the order that they were released

AAC media poll
The AAC media poll was released on July 24, 2018, with the Huskies predicted to finish fifth in the AAC East Division.

Schedule

Roster

Game summaries

UCF

at Boise State

Rhode Island

at Syracuse

Cincinnati

at Memphis

at South Florida

UMass

at Tulsa

SMU

at East Carolina

Temple

References

UConn
UConn Huskies football seasons
UConn Huskies football